The men's kumite +80 kg competition in karate at the 2005 World Games took place on 23 July 2005 at the Kfraftzentrale in Duisburg, Germany.

Competition format
A total of 8 athletes entered the competition. In elimination round they fought in two groups. From this stage the best two athletes qualifies to the semifinals.

Results

Elimination round

Group A

Group B

Finals

References

Karate at the 2005 World Games